Peter J. Rousseeuw (born 13 October 1956) is a statistician known for his work on robust statistics and cluster analysis. He obtained his PhD in 1981 at the Vrije Universiteit Brussel, following research carried out at the ETH in Zurich, which led to a book on influence functions. Later he was professor at the Delft University of Technology, The Netherlands, at the University of Fribourg, Switzerland, and at the University of Antwerp, Belgium. Next he was a senior researcher at Renaissance Technologies. He then returned to Belgium as professor at KU Leuven, until becoming emeritus in 2022. His former PhD students include Annick Leroy, Hendrik Lopuhaä, Geert Molenberghs, Christophe Croux, Mia Hubert, Stefan Van Aelst, Tim Verdonck and Jakob Raymaekers.

Research 

Rousseeuw has constructed and published many useful techniques. He proposed the Least Trimmed Squares method
 and S-estimators for
robust regression, which can resist outliers in the data.

He also introduced the Minimum Volume Ellipsoid and Minimum Covariance Determinant methods
for robust scatter matrices. This work led to his book Robust Regression and Outlier Detection with Annick Leroy.

With Leonard Kaufman he coined the term medoid when proposing the k-medoids method for cluster analysis, also known as Partitioning Around Medoids (PAM).
His silhouette display shows the result of a cluster analysis, and the corresponding silhouette coefficient is often used to select the number of clusters. The work on cluster analysis led to a book titled Finding Groups in Data. 
Rousseeuw was the original developer of the R package cluster along with Mia Hubert and Anja Struyf.

The Rousseeuw-Croux scale estimator  is an efficient alternative to
the median absolute deviation (see robust measures of scale).

With Ida Ruts and John Tukey he introduced the bagplot, a
bivariate generalization of the boxplot.

His more recent work has focused on concepts and algorithms for statistical depth functions in the settings of multivariate, regression and functional data, and on robust principal component analysis.  His current research is on visualization of classification and cellwise outliers.

Recognition 
Rousseeuw was elected Member of International Statistical Institute (1991), Fellow of Institute of Mathematical Statistics (1993), and Fellow of the American Statistical Association (1994). His 1984 paper on robust regression has been reprinted in Breakthroughs in Statistics, which collected and annotated the 60 most influential papers in statistics from 1850 to 1990. He became an ISI highly cited researcher in 2003, and was awarded the Jack Youden Prize (2018) and the Frank Wilcoxon Prize (2021).

Creation of the Rousseeuw Prize for Statistics 

From 2016 onward Peter Rousseeuw worked on creating a new biennial prize, sponsored by him. The goal of the prize is to recognize outstanding statistical innovations with impact on society, and to promote awareness of the important role and intellectual content of statistics and its profound impact on human endeavors. The award amount is 1 million US dollars, similar to the Nobel Prize in other fields. The first award in 2022 went to the topic of Causal Inference in Medicine and Public Health. It was presented by His Majesty King Philippe of Belgium to the laureates James Robins, Andrea Rotnitzky, Thomas Richardson, Miguel Hernán and Eric Tchetgen Tchetgen.

References 

Living people
1956 births
Belgian statisticians
People from Wilrijk
Fellows of the American Statistical Association
Fellows of the Institute of Mathematical Statistics
R (programming language) people